Minuscule 552 (in the Gregory-Aland numbering), ε 252 (in the Soden numbering), is a Greek minuscule manuscript of the New Testament, on parchment. Palaeographically it has been assigned to the 12th century. 
Scrivener labelled it by number 539. The manuscript has complex contents.

Description 

The codex contains a complete text of the four Gospels on 252 parchment leaves (size ). The writing is in one column per page, 27 lines per page.

There is also a division according to the smaller Ammonian Sections, but without references to the Eusebian Canons.

Text 

Kurt Aland did not place the Greek text of the codex in any Category.
According to the Claremont Profile Method it represents the textual family Kx in Luke 1 and Luke 20. In Luke 10 it belongs to the group M106. It belong also to the textual cluster 1053 in Luke 1 and Luke 20.

It has an unusual readings. The text of Luke 22:43-44 is omitted.

History 

The manuscript was held in the monastery Mar Saba. In 1834 Robert Curzon, Lord Zouche, brought this manuscript to England (along with the codices 548, 553, 554). The entire collection of Curzon was bequeathed by his daughter in 1917 to the British Museum, where it had been deposited, by his son, since 1876.

The manuscripts was added to the list of the New Testament minuscule manuscripts by F. H. A. Scrivener (539) and C. R. Gregory (552).

The manuscript was examined by Scrivener, Dean Burgon, and Gregory (in 1883).

It is currently housed at the British Library (Add MS 39595) in London.

See also 

 List of New Testament minuscules
 Biblical manuscript
 Textual criticism

References

Further reading 
 S. Emmel, Catalogue of Materials for Writing, Early Writings on Tablets and Stones, rolled and other Manuscripts and Oriental Manuscript Books, in the Library of the Honourable Robert Curzon (London 1849).

External links 

Greek New Testament minuscules
12th-century biblical manuscripts
British Library additional manuscripts